Natalie Wilkie (born January 21, 2001) is a Canadian Paralympic cross-country skier. As the youngest member of Team Canada at the 2018 Winter Paralympic Games, Wilkie won gold, silver, and bronze medals at the PyeongChang, South Korea games.

Career 
Wilkie began training and competing in able-bodied cross-country skiing when she was 4 years old, growing up near the Larch Hills Cross Country Ski Area near Salmon Arm, BC, Canada.

In June 2016, as a Grade 9 student at Salmon Arm Secondary School, Wilkie lost four fingers on her left hand in an accident involving a jointer during a school woodworking class. She resumed training with her able-bodied ski club only two weeks after the accident.

Wilkie was introduced to para cross-country skiing at a camp in Canmore, Alberta in November 2016. Today, she competes nationally in Canada in both Paralympic cross-country skiing using a single ski pole and in able-bodied cross-country skiing using two ski poles.

Wilkie was designated the “CTV Athlete of the Week” on December 18, 2017.

In February 2018, Wilkie was selected as the youngest member of the PyeongChang 2018 Canadian Paralympic Team. At the 2018 Winter Paralympic Games, at the age of 17, she won a gold medal in the Women's 7.5 km Classic, Standing, a silver medal in the 4x2.5 Mixed Relay, a bronze medal in the Women's 1.5 km Sprint Classic, Standing, and placed sixth in the Women's 15 km Free, Standing.

At the 2019 World Para Nordic Skiing Championships held in Prince George, Canada, Wilkie won silver medals in the Women's Long C, Standing and Mixed Relay events. She also earned 4th place finishes in the Women's Sprint F, Standing and Women's Middle F, Standing events. At the Sapporo 2019 World Para Nordic Skiing World Cup held in March 2019, Wilkie won a gold medal in the Women's Short C, Standing and a silver medal in the Women's Middle F, Standing events.

References

External links 
 
 

2001 births
Living people
Canadian female cross-country skiers
Cross-country skiers at the 2018 Winter Paralympics
Cross-country skiers at the 2022 Winter Paralympics
Paralympic cross-country skiers of Canada
Paralympic gold medalists for Canada
Paralympic silver medalists for Canada
Paralympic bronze medalists for Canada
Medalists at the 2018 Winter Paralympics
Medalists at the 2022 Winter Paralympics
Paralympic medalists in cross-country skiing
21st-century Canadian women